Matteo I Visconti (1250–1322) was the second of the Milanese Visconti family to govern Milan. Matteo was born to Teobaldo Visconti and Anastasia Pirovano.

In 1287, Matteo's uncle Ottone Visconti, archbishop and first lord of Milan, nominated him as capitano del popolo of Milan. Following his uncle's death in 1295, he succeeded him as lord of Milan. Matteo was appointed numerous times as Imperial Vicar over the whole of Lombardy, while expanding, with the assistance of his sons, his sphere of influence to Piedmont, Emilia, Bologna, and Genoa. Caught between the Papal and Imperial power struggle over northern Italy, Matteo would renounce his imperial title for "General Lord of the Milanese People". Found guilty on the charge of necromancy, excommunicated, and facing a crusade, Matteo resigned his position and died months later. He was succeeded by his son Galeazzo I.

Life

The early years
Matteo was the son of Teobaldo Visconti, and the great-nephew of the first lord (that is, governor) of Milan, Ottone Visconti. His mother was Anastasia Pirovano. In August, 1269, Matteo married Bonacossa Borri. His great-uncle Ottone appointed him Capitano del Popolo [Captain of the People] of Milan, after winning the battle of Desio. In 1289 and 1294, the citizens of Milan re-elected him Captain of the people.

Imperial influence
Following the death of William VII, Marquess of Montferrat in 1292, Matteo expanded his influence westward, taking Casale, gaining the lordships of Novara and Vercelli, and the captaincy of Alessandria. His expansion was temporary as William's son, John of Monferrat, re-took Alessandria and forced the Ghibellines out of Novara and Vercelli.

Despite this setback, Matteo was appointed Imperial Vicar of Lombardy in 1294 by Adolf of Nassau. The next year, after the death of Ottone, a period of struggle for domination of Milan began anew between the Ghibellines (the supporters of the Kings of the Romans and Holy Roman Emperors and thus also of Matteo as Imperial Vicar) and the Guelphs, the partisans of the Pope led by the traditional enemies of the Visconti, the Della Torre family. In 1299, Albert I of Germany reappointed him as Imperial Vicar.

Matteo managed to remain at the helm of the city until June 1302, when Guido della Torre again took the lordship of Milan, through a league formed by the Torriani and the anti-Visconti families of the cities of Cremona, Pavia, Piacenza, Novara, Vercelli, Lodi, Crema, and Monferrato led by Alberto Scotti and Ghiberto da Correggio. Matteo's home in Milan was attacked and looted. Forced into exile, Matteo remained for several years a guest of the Scaliger family at Nogarola (Motteggiana).

In 1311, Matteo met the German King Henry VII at Asti and from this, received a mandate to reach a peace agreement in Lombardy. On 4December that year, Matteo and the archbishop Cassone della Torre signed an agreement. Between December 1310 and February 1311, the German King, who was crowned King of Italy on 6January by Cassone della Torre, tried to find common ground between the Torriani and Visconti. However, on 12February, German soldiers of Henry VIII faced an armed Torriani force, led by Guido della Torre, who did not accept the treaty between their cousin Cassone and Matteo. The King's forces prevailed and Guido della Torre fled Milan. Due to his suspected involvement in della Torre's downfall, Matteo was exiled for a time, but on 13July 1311 King Henry sold the title of imperial vicar for Milan to Matteo. They then organized a league that included Milan, Como, Novara, Vercelli, Bergamo, Brescia, Lodi, Cremona, and Piacenza, which had all become Ghibelline cities loyal to the Emperor. Just over a year later, the Emperor died on 24August 1313 at Buonconvento in Tuscany. In 1314, claiming descent from the fictitious counts of Angera, Matteo occupied Angera castle, property of the archbishop of Milan. He commissioned a fresco in the main hall of the castle which illustrated the victory of the Visconti family over Napoleone della Torre at the battle of Desio.

Suppression of the Guelphs

Matteo, despite his lack of military talent, had warlike sons who were directly involved in the war against the Guelphs. In October 1315 Matteo's sons, Marco Visconti and Luchino Visconti defeated the Tuscan Guelphs on the Scrivia River near Voghera, which was followed by the capture of Pavia. This re-established Ghibelline control. For security Matteo built a castle with a Milanese garrison in the city, captained by his son Luchino.

Conflict with the Church
In an attempt to halt imperial influence over northern Italy, Pope John XXII declared in his bull of 1317, Si fratrum, that anyone claiming the title "Imperial Vicar" without papal consent would be excommunicated. This bull was specifically directed at Matteo of Milan, Cangranda della Scala in Verona and Este in Ferrara. In response, Matteo took the title "General Lord of the Milanese People". The pope appointed two emissaries, Bernard Gui and Bertrand de la Tour, to investigate the Ghibelline areas of Milan, Lombardy, and Romagna. These emissaries insisted on the freeing and restoration of Guelphs. When their peace efforts failed, the pope entrusted the bishops of Asti and Como to enforce the peace accords with the threat of excommunication and interdict. In September, the pope appointed Aicardo Camodeia, a Franciscan, as Archbishop of Milan. During this time, the papal legate, Cardinal Bertrand du Poujet, proclaimed from Asti a holy crusade against the Visconti.

Excommunication

In 1322 at Avignon, Pope John XXII raised the charge of necromancy against Matteo. Matteo refused to appear before the court in the papal city, citing his age and the precarious state of health. The next month the court convicted Matteo in absentia of necromancy. In December, the Pope asked his appointee, the de jure Archbishop of Milan, Aicardo da Camodeia, to open a new case of heresy against Matteo and his son, Galeazzo. Archbishop Camodeia judged them as heretics, condemned Matteo, and ordered the confiscation of his property and the vacating of all his offices.

At the end of May 1322, Matteo ceded power to his son Galeazzo and retired to Crescenzago. Matteo died 24June 1322.

Family
He married Bonacossa Borri; they had nine children:

Floramonda, who married Guido Mandelli, the Count of Maccagno
Galeazzo I (b. 1277), Lord of Milan, who married Beatrice d'Este, daughter of Obizzo II d'Este and widow of Nino Visconti 
Beatrice (about n.1280), who married Spinetta Malaspina, Marquis of Verucola (Fivizzano)
Catherine (b. about 1282), who married Alboino I della Scala
Luchino (b. about 1285) Lord of Milan, married three times: to Violante of Saluzzo, daughter of Thomas I of Saluzzo, then to Caterina Spinola, daughter of Obizzo Spinola, and, in 1349, to Isabella Fieschi, niece of Pope Adrian V;
Stefano (b. about 1287), Count of Arona, married Valentina Doria, daughter of Bernabò Doria and Eliana Fieschi;
 (b. about 1289)
Giovanni (b. about 1291), archbishop of Milan;
Zaccarina (b. around 1295), who married Otto Rusconi;
Agnese, who married Cecchino della Scala

See also

List of rulers of Milan

References

Sources

External links

 (in Italian) The actor Gabriel Germinario in part of Matteo Visconti, in a scene from the show Once upon a Revolt, by Dimitri Patrizi, inspired by the Battle of Desio

1250 births
1322 deaths
13th-century Italian nobility
14th-century Italian nobility
House of Visconti
Rulers of Milan